Olgastretet (English: Olga Strait) is a strait in the Svalbard archipelago, separating Edgeøya and Barentsøya from Svenskøya of the Kong Karls Land. The strait takes its name from Olga Nikolaevna of Russia (1822-1892).

References

Straits of Svalbard
Barentsøya
Edgeøya
Svenskøya